The National Energy Policy of Nigeria establishes guidelines for the protection of the environment in the exploitation of Nigeria's fossil fuels. It also emphasizes the exploration of renewable and alternative energy sources, primarily solar, wind, and biomass.

In 2021 at the COP26, the Nigerian government announced an Energy Transition Plan that seeks to meet its mid-century decarbonisation targets.

References

External links

National Energy Policy of The Federal Republic of Nigeria
Energy Commission of Nigeria
Institutional Aspects of Sustainable Development in Nigeria:UN

Energy policy in Africa
Energy in Nigeria